Delay-tolerant networking (DTN) is an approach to computer network architecture that seeks to address the technical issues in heterogeneous networks that may lack continuous network connectivity. Examples of such networks are those operating in mobile or extreme terrestrial environments, or planned networks in space.

Recently, the term disruption-tolerant networking has gained currency in the United States due to support from DARPA, which has funded many DTN projects. Disruption may occur because of the limits of wireless radio range, sparsity of mobile nodes, energy resources, attack, and noise.

History 

In the 1970s, spurred by the decreasing size of computers, researchers began developing technology for routing between non-fixed locations of computers. While the field of ad hoc routing was inactive throughout the 1980s, the widespread use of wireless protocols reinvigorated the field in the 1990s as mobile ad hoc networking (MANET) and vehicular ad hoc networking became areas of increasing interest.

Concurrently with (but separate from) the MANET activities, DARPA had funded NASA, MITRE and others to develop a proposal for the Interplanetary Internet (IPN). Internet pioneer Vint Cerf and others developed the initial IPN architecture, relating to the necessity of networking technologies that can cope with the significant delays and packet corruption of deep-space communications. In 2002, Kevin Fall started to adapt some of the ideas in the IPN design to terrestrial networks and coined the term delay-tolerant networking and the DTN acronym. A paper published in 2003 SIGCOMM conference gives the motivation for DTNs. The mid-2000s brought about increased interest in DTNs, including a growing number of academic conferences on delay and disruption-tolerant networking, and growing interest in combining work from sensor networks and MANETs with the work on DTN. This field saw many optimizations on classic ad hoc and delay-tolerant networking algorithms and began to examine factors such as security, reliability, verifiability, and other areas of research that are well understood in traditional computer networking.

Routing 

The ability to transport, or route, data from a source to a destination is a fundamental ability all communication networks must have. Delay and disruption-tolerant networks (DTNs), are characterized by their lack of connectivity, resulting in a lack of instantaneous end-to-end paths. In these challenging environments, popular ad hoc routing protocols such as AODV and DSR fail to establish routes. This is due to these protocols trying to first establish a complete route and then, after the route has been established, forward the actual data. However, when instantaneous end-to-end paths are difficult or impossible to establish, routing protocols must take to a "store and forward" approach, where data is incrementally moved and stored throughout the network in hopes that it will eventually reach its destination. A common technique used to maximize the probability of a message being successfully transferred is to replicate many copies of the message in the hope that one will succeed in reaching its destination. This is feasible only on networks with large amounts of local storage and internode bandwidth relative to the expected traffic. In many common problem spaces, this inefficiency is outweighed by the increased efficiency and shortened delivery times made possible by taking maximum advantage of available unscheduled forwarding opportunities. In others, where available storage and internode throughput opportunities are more tightly constrained, a more discriminate algorithm is required.

Other concerns

Bundle protocols 
In efforts to provide a shared framework for algorithm and application development in DTNs, RFC 4838 and RFC 5050 were published in 2007 to define a common abstraction to software running on disrupted networks. Commonly known as the Bundle Protocol, this protocol defines a series of contiguous data blocks as a bundle—where each bundle contains enough semantic information to allow the application to make progress where an individual block may not. Bundles are routed in a store and forward manner between participating nodes over varied network transport technologies (including both IP and non-IP based transports). The transport layers carrying the bundles across their local networks are called bundle convergence layers. The bundle architecture therefore operates as an overlay network, providing a new naming architecture based on Endpoint Identifiers (EIDs) and coarse-grained class of service offerings.

Protocols using bundling must leverage application-level preferences for sending bundles across a network. Due to the store and forward nature of delay-tolerant protocols, routing solutions for delay-tolerant networks can benefit from exposure to application-layer information. For example, network scheduling can be influenced if application data must be received in its entirety, quickly, or without variation in packet delay. Bundle protocols collect application data into bundles that can be sent across heterogeneous network configurations with high-level service guarantees. The service guarantees are generally set by the application level, and the RFC 5050 Bundle Protocol specification includes "bulk", "normal", and "expedited" markings.

In October 2014 the Internet Engineering Task Force (IETF) instantiated a Delay Tolerant Networking working group to review and revise the protocol specified in RFC5050. The Bundle Protocol for CCSDS is a profile of RFC5050 specifically addressing the Bundle Protocol's utility for data communication in space missions.

As of January 2022, the IETF published the following RFC's related to BPv7: RFC 9171, RFC 9172, RFC 9173, RFC 9174.

Security issues 
Addressing security issues has been a major focus of the bundle protocol. Possible attacks take the form of nodes behaving as a "black hole" or a "flooder".

Security concerns for delay-tolerant networks vary depending on the environment and application, though authentication and privacy are often critical. These security guarantees are difficult to establish in a network without continuous bi-directional end-to-end paths between devices because the network hinders complicated cryptographic protocols, hinders key exchange, and each device must identify other intermittently visible devices. Solutions have typically been modified from mobile ad hoc network and distributed security research, such as the use of distributed certificate authorities and PKI schemes. Original solutions from the delay-tolerant research community include: 1) the use of identity-based encryption, which allows nodes to receive
information encrypted with their public identifier; and 2) the use of tamper-evident tables with a gossiping protocol;

Implementations
There are a number of implementations of the Bundle Protocol:

BPv6 (RFC5050, Bundle Protocol for CCSDS) 
The main implementation of BPv6 are listed below. A number of other implementations exist.

 High-rate DTN-C++17 - based; performance-optimized DTN; runs directly on Linux and Windows.  
 NASA Interplanetary Overlay Network (ION)—Written in C; designed to run on a wide variety of platforms; conforms to restrictions for space flight software (e.g. no dynamic memory allocation).
 IBR-DTN—C++ - based; runs on routers with OpenWRT; also contains JAVA applications (router and user apps) for use on Android.
 DTN2—C++ - based; designed to be a reference / learning / teaching implementation of the Bundle Protocol.
 DTN Marshal Enterprise (DTNME) — C++ - based; Enterprise solution; designed as an operational DTN implementation. Currently used in ISS operations. DTNME is a single implementation supporting both BPv6 and BPv7.

BPv7 (Internet Research Task Force RFC) 
The draft of BPv7 lists six known implementations.

 High-rate DTN-C++17 - based; performance-optimized DTN; runs directly on Linux and Windows.
 µPCN—C; built upon the POSIX API as well as FreeRTOS and intended to run on low-cost micro satellites.
 PyDTN—Python; developed by X-works and during the IETF 101 Hackathon.
 Terra—Java; developed in the context of terrestrial DTN.
 dtn7-go—Go; implementation focused on easy extensibility and suitable for research.
 dtn7-rs—Rust; intended for environments with limited resources and performance requirements.
 NASA Interplanetary Overlay Network (ION)—C; intended to be usable in embedded environments including spacecraft flight computers.
 DTN Marshal Enterprise (DTNME) — C++ - based; Enterprise solution; designed as an operational DTN implementation. Currently used in ISS operations. DTNME is a single implementation supporting both BPv6 and BPv7.

Other NASA open source DTN for BPv7 implementations: 
 NASA BPLib - C; A Bundle Protocol library and associated applications by Goddard Space Flight Center. Intended for general use, particularly in space flight applications, integration with cFS (core Flight System), and other applications where store-and-forward capabilities are needed.

Research efforts

Various research efforts are currently investigating the issues involved with DTN:

 The Delay-Tolerant Networking Research Group.
 The Technology and Infrastructure for Developing Regions project at UC Berkeley
 The Bytewalla research project at the Royal Institute of Technology, KTH
 The KioskNet research project at the University of Waterloo.
 The DieselNet research project at the University of Massachusetts Amherst, Amherst.
 The ResiliNets Research Initiative at the University of Kansas and Lancaster University.
 The Haggle EU research project.
 The Space Internetworking Center EU/FP7 project at the Democritus University of Thrace.
 The N4C EU/FP7 research project.
 The WNaN DARPA project.
 The EMMA and OPTRACOM projects at TU Braunschweig
 The DTN at Helsinki University of Technology.
 The SARAH project, funded by the French National Research Agency (ANR).
 The development of the DoDWAN platform at Université Bretagne Sud.
 The CROWD project, funded by the French National Research Agency (ANR).
 The PodNet project at KTH Stockholm and ETH Zurich.

Some research efforts look at DTN for the Interplanetary Internet by examining use of the Bundle Protocol in space:
 The Saratoga project at the University of Surrey, which was the first to test the bundle protocol in space on the UK-DMC Disaster Monitoring Constellation satellite in 2008.
 NASA JPL's Deep Impact Networking (DINET) Experiment on board the Deep Impact/EPOXI spacecraft.
 BioServe Space Technologies, one of the first payload developers to adopt the DTN technology, has utilized their CGBA (Commercial Generic Bioprocessing Apparatus) payloads on board the ISS, which provide computational/communications platforms, to implement the DTN protocol.
 NASA, ESA Use Experimental Interplanetary Internet to Test Robot From International Space Station

See also 
 Logistical Networking
 Message switching
 Store and forward

References

Network architecture
Network protocols